Stella Jongmans (born 17 May 1971, in Voorburg) is a retired Dutch athlete who specialised in the 800 metres. She won the gold at the 1995 Summer Universiade and silver at the 1996 European Indoor Championships. In addition, she represented The Netherlands at two Olympic Games, in 1992 and 1996.

Competition record

Personal bests
Outdoor
400 metres – 53.24 (Hague 1996)
800 metres – 1:58.61 (Hengelo 1992)
1000 metres – 2:38.10 (Stockholm 1995)
1500 metres – 4:15.69 (Assen 1994)
One mile – 4:38.44 (Hilversum 1994)
3000 metres – 9:29.99 (Hague 1992)

Indoor
400 metres – 55.18 (Ghent 2000)
800 metres – 2:00.6 (Erfurt 2000)
1000 metres – 2:39.70 (Liévin 1996)
1500 metres – 4:16.65 (Hague 1993)

References

1971 births
Living people
Dutch female middle-distance runners
Athletes (track and field) at the 1992 Summer Olympics
Athletes (track and field) at the 1996 Summer Olympics
Olympic athletes of the Netherlands
World Athletics Championships athletes for the Netherlands
Universiade medalists in athletics (track and field)
Sportspeople from Voorburg
Universiade gold medalists for the Netherlands
Medalists at the 1995 Summer Universiade
20th-century Dutch women
21st-century Dutch women